Northacre plc is a British property company that develops luxury apartments in London, and is 69% owned by Abu Dhabi Financial Group (ADFG).

History
Northacre was founded in 1977 by the German architect Klas Nilsson, with Nilsson Architects, which he founded in 1975, becoming a wholly owned subsidiary. As of 2015, he is the non-executive chairman.

Abu Dhabi Financial Group (ADFG) acquired 68.84% of Northacre, which it owns via Spadille Limited, a Jersey-registered investment vehicle.

Developments
Northacre owns The Lancasters, a development of 77 apartments in Bayswater, which was originally a terrace of 15 stucco-fronted Grade-II listed mid-nineteenth houses.

Northacre has submitted plans to redevelop New Scotland Yard, the Metropolitan Police headquarters, which was bought by ADFG in December 2014 for £370 million, into luxury apartments.

References

Property companies of the United Kingdom
Companies based in the London Borough of Wandsworth
Construction and civil engineering companies established in 1977
1977 establishments in the United Kingdom
Real estate companies established in 1977